The 31st Indian Armoured Division was an armoured division of the Indian Army during World War II, formed in 1940, originally as the 1st Indian Armoured Division; it consisted of units of the British Army and the British Indian Army. When it was raised, it consisted of two Armoured Brigades (the 1st and 2nd Indian Armoured Brigades) and one Motor Brigade (the 3rd Indian Motor Brigade).

History
In October 1941, by which time the 1st Indian Support Group had joined the division, the 1st Indian Armoured Division was re-named as the 31st Indian Armoured Division. The brigades were re-named the 251st and 252nd Indian Armoured Brigades and the 31st Indian Support Group (the Motor Brigade's name remained unchanged).

In mid-1942, by which time the support group had been disbanded, the 251st Brigade was detached and the rest of the division was shipped to join the Tenth Army and served in Iraq, Syria and Lebanon. At this time the General Officer Commanding was Major General Robert Wordsworth and the Commander Royal Artillery was Brigadier C. P. B. Wilson. The division never saw combat, although the 3rd Indian Motor Brigade was detached to Egypt and saw much action in the Western Desert Campaign during 1941 and 1942 and again in 1944 and 1945 when, reformed as the 43rd Indian Infantry Brigade (Lorried), it was sent to the Italian Campaign as an independent brigade. The closest the rest of the division came to combat was in April 1944 when it was rushed to Egypt to crush a mutiny among the Greek 1st Infantry Brigade.

The tank regiments received M4 Shermans in November 1943, thought to be in preparation for a transfer to Italy, which never came about and only drove them in Iraq, Syria and Egypt. The 31st Indian Armoured Division was re-named the 1 Armoured Division of the soon-to-be independent Indian Army in October 1945.

With the 31st Division re-named, there was no division numbered '31' in the post-independence Indian Army after 1947 for over twenty years. The 31 Armoured Division was re-established as part of the Indian Army in 1972. It was raised at Jhansi and remains headquartered there as part of XXI Corps. It is also known as the White Tiger Division.

Structure in 1942

252nd Indian Armoured Brigade
Brigade Commander G.Carr-White
14th/20th Hussars
14th Prince of Wales's Own Scinde Horse
1/4th Bombay Grenadiers

3rd Indian Motor Brigade

Brigade Commander A.A.E. Filose 
2nd Lancers (Gardner's Horse)
11th Prince Albert Victor's Own Cavalry (Frontier Force)
18th King Edward's Own Cavalry
after January 1943
2/6th Gurkha Rifles
2/8th Gurkha Rifles
2/10th Gurkha Rifles

Divisional Units
13th Duke of Connaught's Own Lancers
15th Field Regiment, Royal Artillery
144th (Surrey & Sussex Yeomanry Queen Mary's) Field Regiment, R.A.
79th Antitank Regiment, R.A.
32nd Field Squadron, QVO Madras Sappers & Miners, Indian Engineers
39th Field Park Squadron, QVO Madras Sappers & Miners, I.E.
31st Indian Armoured Divisional Signals

Citations

References

External links 
https://web.archive.org/web/20111126065316/http://www.indianmilitaryhistory.org/divisions/31div.htm

Indian World War II divisions
Divisions of the Indian Army
British Indian Army divisions
Armored divisions
Military units and formations established in 1940
Military units and formations of the British Empire in World War II